Fructose 1,6-bisphosphate, also known as Harden-Young ester, is fructose sugar phosphorylated on carbons 1 and 6 (i.e., is a fructosephosphate). The β-D-form of this compound is common in cells.  Upon entering the cell, most glucose and fructose is converted to fructose 1,6-bisphosphate.

In glycolysis
Fructose 1,6-bisphosphate lies within the glycolysis metabolic pathway and is produced by phosphorylation of fructose 6-phosphate. It is, in turn, broken down into two compounds: glyceraldehyde 3-phosphate and dihydroxyacetone phosphate. It is an allosteric activator of pyruvate kinase through distinct interactions of binding and allostery at the enzyme's catalytic site 

      

The numbering of the carbon atoms indicates the fate of the carbons according to their position in fructose 6-phosphate.

Isomerism

Fructose 1,6-bisphosphate has only one biologically active isomer, the β-D-form. There are many other isomers, analogous to those of fructose.

Iron chelation

Fructose 1,6-bis(phosphate) has also been implicated in the ability to bind and sequester Fe(II), a soluble form of iron whose oxidation to the insoluble Fe(III) is capable of generating reactive oxygen species via Fenton chemistry. The ability of fructose 1,6-bis(phosphate) to bind Fe(II) may prevent such electron transfers, and thus act as an antioxidant within the body. Certain neurodegenerative diseases, like Alzheimer's and Parkinson's, have been linked to metal deposits with high iron content, although it is uncertain whether Fenton chemistry plays a substantial role in these diseases, or whether fructose 1,6-bis(phosphate) is capable of mitigating those effects.

See also
 Fructose 2,6-bisphosphate

References

External links

Monosaccharide derivatives
Organophosphates
Glycolysis